The James River and Kanawha Turnpike was built to facilitate portage of shipments of passengers and freight by water between the western reaches of the James River via the James River and Kanawha Canal and the eastern reaches of the Kanawha River.

Originally proposed by a young George Washington in his surveyor days prior to the American Revolution, the canal and turnpike combination was seen as the key for Virginia to compete with northern states for rich trade to the west. However, the canal portion was an expensive project which failed several times financially, was frequently damaged by floods, and was never fully completed, although sections served for many years. It was largely financed by the Virginia Board of Public Works until after the American Civil War, when funds for continued financial help were not available from the war-torn state or private sources. In 1873, Collis P. Huntington completed the Chesapeake and Ohio Railway (C&O) from the head of navigation at Richmond, Virginia to the Ohio River at Huntington, West Virginia (named in his honor), and the canal finally succumbed to the competition and the advancing transportation technology of the railroads. In the 1880s, the canal was bought and dismantled by one of the railroads, which built along the towpath and soon became part of the C & O.

Turnpike today
The Turnpike portion of the combination envisioned by Washington remained a major roadway much longer, and was only supplanted by the completion of Interstate 64 (I-64) in 1988. Much of the route of the James River and Kanawha Turnpike through West Virginia is today the Midland Trail, a National Scenic Byway, and is signed as U.S. Route 60 (US 60). Ironically, while the historic road was long a turnpike financed through collection of tolls, today it is a toll-free favorite of shunpikers seeking either an avoidance of tolls on the West Virginia Turnpike, a scenic and bucolic interlude, or both.

Sources

 

Turnpikes in Virginia
Turnpikes in West Virginia
U.S. Route 60
Interstate 64